The 1954 Western Reserve Red Cats football team represented the Western Reserve University in the American city of Cleveland, Ohio, now known as Case Western Reserve University, during the 1954 college football season.  The Red Cats were a member of the Mid-American Conference (MAC).

The team was coached by Edward L. Finnigan and a notable player was captain fullback Gordon McCarter.

Schedule

References

Western Reserve
Case Western Reserve Spartans football seasons
Western Reserve Red Cats football